In mathematics, the hypergraph regularity method is a powerful tool in extremal graph theory that refers to the combined application of the hypergraph regularity lemma and the associated counting lemma. It is a generalization of the graph regularity method, which refers to the use of Szemerédi's regularity and counting lemmas.

Very informally, the hypergraph regularity lemma decomposes any given -uniform hypergraph into a random-like object with bounded parts (with an appropriate boundedness and randomness notions) that is usually easier to work with. On the other hand, the hypergraph counting lemma estimates the number of hypergraphs of a given isomorphism class in some collections of the random-like parts. This is an extension of Szemerédi's regularity lemma that partitions any given graph into bounded number parts such that edges between the parts behave almost randomly. Similarly, the hypergraph counting lemma is a generalization of the graph counting lemma that estimates number of copies of a fixed graph as a subgraph of a larger graph.  
 
There are several distinct formulations of the method, all of which imply the hypergraph removal lemma and a number of other powerful results, such as Szemerédi's theorem, as well as some of its multidimensional extensions. The following formulations are due to V. Rödl, B. Nagle, J. Skokan, M. Schacht, and Y. Kohayakawa, for alternative versions see Tao (2006), and Gowers (2007).

Definitions 
In order to state the hypergraph regularity and counting lemmas formally, we need to define several rather technical terms to formalize appropriate notions of pseudo-randomness (random-likeness) and boundedness, as well as to describe the random-like blocks and partitions.

Notation

 denotes a -uniform clique on  vertices.
  is an -partite -graph on vertex partition .
In particular,  is a complete -partite -graph.
The following defines an important notion of relative density, which roughly describes the fraction of -edges spanned by -edges that are in the hypergraph. For example, when , the quantity  is equal to the fraction of triangles formed by 2-edges in the subhypergraph that are 3-edges. Definition [Relative density]. Suppose  is an integer. Let  be a subhypergraph of the induced -partite  graph . Define the relative density   .What follows is the appropriate notion of pseudorandomness that the regularity method will use. Informally, by this concept of regularity, -edges have some control over -edges. More precisely, this defines a setting where density of  edges in large subhypergraphs is roughly the same as one would expect based on the relative density alone. Formally,Definition [()-regularity]. In Szemerédi regularity, 2-edges are regularized versus 1-edges (vertices). In this generalized notion, -edges are regularized versus -edges for all . More precisely, this defines a notion of regular hypergraph called -complex, in which existence of -edge implies existence of all underlying -edges, as well as their relative regularity. Moreover, the density of 3-edges over all possible triangles made by 2-edges is roughly the same in every collection of subhypergraphs.Definition [-regular -complex]. An -complex  is a system  of -partite  graphs  satisfying .

 For each ,  is -regular with density .
 For each ,  is -regular with respect to .The following describes the equitable partition that the hypergraph regularity lemma will induce. A -equitable family of partition is a sequence of partitions of 1-edges (vertices), 2-edges (pairs), 3-edges (triples), etc. This is an important distinction from the partition obtained by Szemerédi's regularity lemma, where only vertices are being partitioned. In fact, Gowers demonstrated that solely vertex partition can not give a sufficiently strong notion of regularity to imply Hypergraph counting lemma. Definition [-equitable partition]. Let  be a vector of positive integers and  be an -element vertex set.

  partitions  so that if  and   then  is partitioned into at most  parts, all of which are members .

In particular, this is the main definition that describes the output of hypergraph regularity lemma bellow.Definition [Regularity with respect to a partition].

Statements

Hypergraph regularity lemma 

Hypergraph counting lemma 
 

.

Applications 
To state it more formally,

Hypergraph removal lemma 
For all  and every , there exists  and  so that the following holds. One of the original motivations for graph regularity method was to prove Szemerédi's theorem, which states that every dense subset of  contains an arithmetic progression of arbitrary length. In fact, by a relatively simple application of the triangle removal lemma, one can prove that every dense subset of   contains an arithmetic progression of length 3. 
 
The hypergraph regularity method and hypergraph removal lemma can prove high-dimensional and ring analogues of density version of Szemerédi's theorems, originally proved by Furstenberg and Katznelson. In fact, this approach yields first quantitative bounds for the theorems.
 
The case when  and the pattern is arithmetic progression of length some length is equivalent to Szemerédi's theorem. Furstenberg and Katznelson Theorem 
 
Tengan, Tokushige, Rödl, and Schacht Theorem 
Let  be a finite ring.
 
In other words, there are some  such that , where ,  is an injection.

References 

Graph theory